Pamela "Pam" Sanford (born c. 1958) is a former Canadian curler.

As of 2022, she works as Head Curling Coach for Special Olympics Halifax program, located at Mayflower Curling Club.

Teams

References

External links
 
 Pamela Sanford – Curling Canada Stats Archive

1950s births
Living people
Canadian women curlers
Canadian women's curling champions
Curlers from Nova Scotia
Sportspeople from Halifax, Nova Scotia